M. J. Bassett (born Michael J. Bassett) is a British film and television writer, director, and producer. She began her career directing the cult horror films Deathwatch (2002) and Wilderness (2006). She also directed the dark fantasy Solomon Kane (2009) and the video game adaptation Silent Hill: Revelation (2012). Since 2012, she has worked as a director, writer, and producer on television series such as Strike Back, Ash vs Evil Dead, Power, and Altered Carbon. She is transgender, and came out in 2017.

Early life
Bassett grew up in Newport, Shropshire, in the West Midlands, where she was educated at Adams Grammar School. Here, she enjoyed a life which she has described as a "safe, unremarkable childhood". Here she developed an obsession with wildlife and nature; Bassett's fascination with films would not arise until much later. Bassett's childhood aspirations were to be a wildlife veterinarian in Africa. Because of her grades in school, a veterinary career became out of the question, and at the age of 16, Bassett left school and became a wildlife filmmaker's assistant, where she would spend 18 months learning photography and film making.

Career
After her time as an assistant, Bassett decided to go back to school to do A-Levels in the hopes of getting a Zoology degree. Once back in school, Bassett wrote to a variety of TV producers, looking for work as a nature presenter. Eventually, Bassett was contacted by Janet Street Porter, shortly after which she began working as a presenter on the children's show Get Fresh, where she presented the science and nature segments. She left to work on other programs, but as work stopped coming in, she was losing interest. At this point, Bassett realized that she wanted to make films. Since moving into film-making would entail substantial risk, Bassett worked for a year animating and voicing the puppet Scally the Dog on Children's ITV while she considered the career change.

Bassett then produced several short films, as well as a 16 mm piece for broadcast television. All the while, Bassett worked on feature scripts which she used to try to catch producers' attention. After a period of years, Bassett's screenplay titled No Man's Land generated significant interest. Many studios offered to purchase the script, but Bassett was determined to direct the film of her screenplay. Eventually, one production company consented to this, and the film was retitled Deathwatch.

She is the current director of Red Sonja, after it had been reported Hannah John-Kamen and Joey Soloway had departed from the film.

Personal life
In 2017, Bassett came out as trans.
She has two daughters, Maddie and Isabel, and one son, Tom.

Filmography

Film

As a film crew
Shooting Fish (1997) (Electronic Press Kit Producer)
Waking Ned (1998) (Electronic Press Kit Director/Producer)
Gabriel & Me (2001) (Electronic Press Kit Director)
Close Your Eyes (2002) (Electronic Press Kit)

Television

References

External links
 
 Comingsoon.net movie news

English film directors
Living people
Newport, Shropshire
Year of birth missing (living people)
People from Newport, Shropshire
People educated at Adams' Grammar School
Horror film directors
LGBT film directors
LGBT television directors
English LGBT screenwriters
Transgender women
Transgender screenwriters
British women television directors
British television directors